Paul Hofer (19 November 1928 – 2 May 2006) was a Swiss ice hockey player who competed in the 1952 Winter Olympics and the 1956 Winter Olympics. In 1952, he participated with the Swiss ice hockey team in the Winter Olympics tournament. In 1956, he participated with the Swiss ice hockey team in the Winter Olympics tournament.

See also
List of Olympic men's ice hockey players for Switzerland

References

External links

1928 births
2006 deaths
Ice hockey players at the 1952 Winter Olympics
Ice hockey players at the 1956 Winter Olympics
Olympic ice hockey players of Switzerland
Swiss ice hockey defencemen